Callitris rhomboidea, commonly known as the Oyster Bay pine, Tasmanian cypress pine, Port Jackson pine, Illawarra Mountain pine, or dune cypress pine, is a species of conifer in the family Cupressaceae. It is native to Australia, occurring in South Australia, Queensland, New South Wales, Victoria and Tasmania. It has become naturalized near Auckland, New Zealand and can be found on the island of Taillefer Rocks in Tasmania.

Description 
Callitris rhomboidea is a spreading evergreen shrub or small tree growing to 15 meters tall. The hairless leaves are keeled dorsally, green or glaucous in colour, and typically measure 2-3 millimeters long, though some may grow to 7 millimeters. This species is monoecious. The female cones are spherical or near spherical and occur in clusters, measuring 8-25 millimeters in diameter when open. The male cones measure around 3 millimeters long, occurring at the ends of branches singly or in clusters.

References

External links
 images

rhomboidea
Pinales of Australia
Trees of Australia
Least concern biota of Queensland
Least concern flora of Australia
Flora of South Australia
Flora of Queensland
Flora of New South Wales
Flora of Victoria (Australia)
Flora of Tasmania
Trees of mild maritime climate
Trees of Mediterranean climate
Taxonomy articles created by Polbot